The Thama Stories are a series of short stories for children about the adventures of a baby elephant and his mother. The books are written by Indian author Kamala Laxman in the 1970s and 1980s. The stories are about the adventurous and carefree elephant. Characters in the books include a wise bird named Gumchikki, a python Hebavoo, Anilu a squirrel, Mangu a monkey, Pasha a tiger, and a human boy. The illustrations are by the author's husband and famous cartoonist R.K. Laxman.

References

External links
 

Indian children's  literature
Picture books
1980s children's books